Decade of the Nail Spiked Bat is a 2-CD compilation album by power metal band Jag Panzer.

Track listing
All tracks by Jag Panzer

Personnel 
Harry "The Tyrant" Conklin – Vocals, Vocals (background)
Mark Briody – Guitar, Vocals (background), Engineer
Chris Broderick – Guitar, Engineer, Mixing
John Tetley – Bass
Rikard Stjernquist – Drums, Mixing
Keith Austin – Artwork
Anthony Clarkson – Layout Design
John Herrera – Engineer
Jag Panzer – Producer
Robin Tetley – Engineer

2003 compilation albums
Jag Panzer albums
Century Media Records compilation albums